Scythris guimarensis is a moth of the family Scythrididae. It was described by Bengt Å. Bengtsson in 1997. It is found on the Canary Islands (Tenerife).

The larvae feed on lichens growing on stones.

References

guimarensis
Moths described in 1997